Birkeland is the administrative centre of the municipality of Birkenes in Agder county, Norway. The village is located on the eastern shore of the river Tovdalselva, across the river from the village of Flakk. The Norwegian National Road 41 runs through the village.

The old Lillesand–Flaksvand Line was a railway line that passed through Birkeland, but it was closed in 1953. The newspaper Birkenesavisa is published in Birkeland.  The Southern Norway Folk high school is located in Birkeland and the Birkenes Church is located just south of Birkeland in the small village of Mollestad.

References

Villages in Agder
Birkenes